In differential geometry, the Willmore conjecture is a lower bound on the Willmore energy of a torus. It is named after the English mathematician Tom Willmore, who conjectured it in 1965. A proof by Fernando Codá Marques and André Neves was announced in 2012 and published in 2014.

Willmore energy

Let v : M → R3 be a smooth immersion of a compact, orientable surface.  Giving M the Riemannian metric induced by v, let H : M → R be the mean curvature (the arithmetic mean of the principal curvatures κ1 and κ2 at each point).  In this notation, the Willmore energy W(M) of M is given by

It is not hard to prove that the Willmore energy satisfies W(M) ≥ 4π, with equality if and only if M is an embedded round sphere.

Statement

Calculation of W(M) for a few examples suggests that there should be a better bound than W(M) ≥ 4π for surfaces with genus g(M) > 0.  In particular, calculation of W(M) for tori with various symmetries led Willmore to propose in 1965 the following conjecture, which now bears his name

 For every smooth immersed torus M in R3, W(M) ≥ 2π2.

In 1982, Peter Wai-Kwong Li and Shing-Tung Yau proved the conjecture in the non-embedded case, showing that if  is an immersion of a compact surface, which is not an embedding, then W(M) is at least 8π.

In 2012, Fernando Codá Marques and André Neves proved the conjecture in the embedded case, using the Almgren–Pitts min-max theory of minimal surfaces. Martin Schmidt claimed a proof in 2002, but it was not accepted for publication in any peer-reviewed mathematical journal (although it did not contain a proof of the Willmore conjecture, he proved some other important conjectures in it). Prior to the proof of Marques and Neves, the Willmore conjecture had already been proved for many special cases, such as tube tori (by Willmore himself), and for tori of revolution (by Langer & Singer).

References

Conjectures that have been proved
Surfaces
Theorems in differential geometry

de:Willmore-Energie